Nicholas Tate is a historian who was educated at Balliol College, University of Oxford, and at the universities of Bristol and Liverpool and until July 2011 was the Director-General of the International School of Geneva, Switzerland. Tate is known to be vocal in his education philosophy and is a fierce critic of undue reliance on standardised testing.

History
Following a career in schools and teacher training institutions in England and Scotland, and in school examining, Tate joined England's National Curriculum Council in 1989 at the time of the establishment of the English national curriculum, and for the next 11 years worked for a succession of public bodies charged with the administration of England's school curriculum, assessment and qualifications systems.

From 1994 to 1997 he was chief executive of the School Curriculum and Assessment Authority and from 1997 to 2000 chief executive of the Qualifications and Curriculum Authority (the bureau was renamed in 1997). In both of these positions he was the chief curriculum and qualifications adviser to the Secretary of State for Education. During this period he courted controversy with his attacks on cultural relativism and on its perceived influence on other educationalists' philosophy.

From 2000 to 2003 (the shortest time in office since 1467) he was headmaster of Winchester College, one of England's leading independent boarding schools. In 2003 he was appointed Director-General of the International School of Geneva and from 2011 to 2013 he was Chairman of International Education Systems (IES). He was Chairman of Trustees of Richmond, The American International University in London 2017–19. Recent publications include 'What is education for?' (2015) and 'The conservative case for education. Against the current' (2017).

He was appointed CBE in 2001 for services to education and training.

References

Further reading 
 IBO.org profile
 June, 2001 BBC News Article

Living people
Year of birth missing (living people)
English educational theorists
Alumni of Balliol College, Oxford
Headmasters of Winchester College